Nowa Gadka is a village in the administrative district of Gmina Ksawerów, within Pabianice County, Łódź Voivodeship, in central Poland.

References

Nowa Gadka